Baltimore (locally:   or  ) is the most populous city in the U.S. state of Maryland, the fourth most populous city in the Mid-Atlantic, and the 30th most populous city in the United States with a population of 585,708 in 2020. Baltimore was designated an independent city by the Constitution of Maryland in 1851, and today it is the most populous independent city in the nation. As of 2021, the population of the Baltimore metropolitan area was estimated to be 2,838,327, making it the nation's 20th largest metropolitan area.

Prior to European colonization, the Baltimore region was used as hunting grounds by the Susquehannock Native Americans, who were primarily settled further northwest than where the city was later built. Colonists from the Province of Maryland established the Port of Baltimore in 1706 to support the tobacco trade with Europe, and established the Town of Baltimore in 1729. The first printing press and newspapers were introduced to Baltimore by Nicholas Hasselbach and William Goddard respectively, in the mid-18th century.

The Battle of Baltimore was a pivotal engagement during the War of 1812, culminating in the failed British bombardment of Fort McHenry, during which Francis Scott Key wrote a poem that would become "The Star-Spangled Banner", which was eventually designated as the American national anthem in 1931. During the Pratt Street Riot of 1861, the city was the site of some of the earliest violence associated with the American Civil War.

The Baltimore and Ohio Railroad, the oldest railroad in the United States, was built in 1830 and cemented Baltimore's status as a major transportation hub, giving producers in the Midwest and Appalachia access to the city's port. Baltimore's Inner Harbor was once the second leading port of entry for immigrants to the United States. In addition, Baltimore was a major manufacturing center. After a decline in major manufacturing, heavy industry, and restructuring of the rail industry, Baltimore has shifted to a service-oriented economy. Johns Hopkins Hospital and Johns Hopkins University are the city's top two employers. Baltimore and its surrounding region are home to the headquarters of a number of major organizations and government agencies, including the NAACP, ABET, the National Federation of the Blind, Catholic Relief Services, the Annie E. Casey Foundation, World Relief, the Centers for Medicare & Medicaid Services, and the Social Security Administration. Baltimore is also home to the Baltimore Orioles of Major League Baseball and the Baltimore Ravens of the National Football League.

Many of Baltimore's neighborhoods have rich histories. The city is home to some of the earliest National Register Historic Districts in the nation, including Fell's Point, Federal Hill, and Mount Vernon. These were added to the National Register between 1969 and 1971, soon after historic preservation legislation was passed. Baltimore has more public statues and monuments per capita than any other city in the country. Nearly one third of the city's buildings (over 65,000) are designated as historic in the National Register, which is more than any other U.S. city. Baltimore has 66 National Register Historic Districts and 33 local historic districts. The historical records of the government of Baltimore are located at the Baltimore City Archives.

History

Pre-settlement
The Baltimore area had been inhabited by Native Americans since at least the 10th millennium BC, when Paleo-Indians first settled in the region. One Paleo-Indian site and several Archaic period and Woodland period archaeological sites have been identified in Baltimore, including four from the Late Woodland period. In December 2021, several Woodland period Native American artifacts were found in Herring Run Park in northeast Baltimore, dating 5,000 to 9,000 years ago. The finding followed a period of dormancy in Baltimore City archaeological findings which had persisted since the 1980s. During the Late Woodland period, the archaeological culture known as the Potomac Creek complex resided in the area from Baltimore south to the Rappahannock River in present-day Virginia.

Etymology
The city is named after Cecil Calvert, 2nd Baron Baltimore, an Anglo-Irish member of the Irish House of Lords and founding proprietor of the Province of Maryland. The Calverts took the title Barons Baltimore from Baltimore Manor, an English Plantation estate they were granted in County Longford, Ireland. Baltimore is an anglicization of the Irish name Baile an Tí Mhóir, meaning "town of the big house".

17th century
In the early 1600s, the immediate Baltimore vicinity was sparsely populated, if at all, by Native Americans. The Baltimore County area northward was used as hunting grounds by the Susquehannock living in the lower Susquehanna River valley. This Iroquoian-speaking people "controlled all of the upper tributaries of the Chesapeake" but "refrained from much contact with Powhatan in the Potomac region" and south into Virginia.
Pressured by the Susquehannock, the Piscataway tribe, an Algonquian-speaking people, stayed well south of the Baltimore area and inhabited primarily the north bank of the Potomac River in what are now Charles and southern Prince George's counties in the coastal areas south of the Fall Line.

European colonization of Maryland began in earnest with the arrival of the merchant ship The Ark carrying 140 colonists at St. Clement's Island in the Potomac River on March 25, 1634. Europeans then began to settle the area further north, in what is now Baltimore County. Since Maryland was a colony, Baltimore's streets were named to show loyalty to the mother country, e.g. King, Queen, King George and Caroline streets. The original county seat, known today as Old Baltimore, was located on Bush River within the present-day Aberdeen Proving Ground. The colonists engaged in sporadic warfare with the Susquehannock, whose numbers dwindled primarily from new infectious diseases, such as smallpox, endemic among the Europeans. In 1661 David Jones claimed the area known today as Jonestown on the east bank of the Jones Falls stream.

18th century

The colonial General Assembly of Maryland created the Port of Baltimore at old Whetstone Point (now Locust Point) in 1706 for the tobacco trade. The Town of Baltimore, on the west side of the Jones Falls, was founded and laid out on July 30, 1729. By 1752 the town had just 27 homes, including a church and two taverns. Jonestown and Fells Point had been settled to the east. The three settlements, covering , became a commercial hub, and in 1768 were designated as the county seat.

The first printing press was introduced to the city in 1765 by Nicholas Hasselbach, whose equipment was later used in the printing of Baltimore's first newspapers, The Maryland Journal and The Baltimore Advertiser, first published by William Goddard in 1773.
 
Baltimore grew swiftly in the 18th century, its plantations producing grain and tobacco for sugar-producing colonies in the Caribbean. The profit from sugar encouraged the cultivation of cane in the Caribbean and the importation of food by planters there. Since Baltimore was the county seat, a courthouse was built in 1768 to serve both the city and county. Its square was a center of community meetings and discussions.

Baltimore established its public market system in 1763. Lexington Market, founded in 1782, is known as one of the oldest continuously operating public markets in the United States today. Lexington Market was also a center of slave trading. Enslaved Black people were sold at numerous sites through the downtown area, with sales advertised in The Baltimore Sun. Both tobacco and sugar cane were labor-intensive crops.

In 1774, Baltimore established the first post office system in what became the United States, and the first water company chartered in the newly independent nation (Baltimore Water Company, 1792).

Baltimore played a part in the American Revolution. City leaders such as Jonathan Plowman Jr. led many residents to resist British taxes, and merchants signed agreements refusing to trade with Britain. The Second Continental Congress met in the Henry Fite House from December 1776 to February 1777, effectively making the city the capital of the United States during this period.

The towns of Baltimore, Jonestown, and Fells Point were incorporated as the City of Baltimore in 1796–1797.

19th century

The city remained a part of surrounding Baltimore County and continued to serve as its county seat from 1768 to 1851, after which it became an independent city.

The Battle of Baltimore against the British in 1814 inspired the U.S. national anthem, "The Star-Spangled Banner", and the construction of the Battle Monument, which became the city's official emblem. A distinctive local culture started to take shape, and a unique skyline peppered with churches and monuments developed. Baltimore acquired its moniker "The Monumental City" after an 1827 visit to Baltimore by President John Quincy Adams. At an evening function, Adams gave the following toast: "Baltimore: the Monumental City—May the days of her safety be as prosperous and happy, as the days of her dangers have been trying and triumphant."

Baltimore pioneered the use of gas lighting in 1816, and its population grew rapidly in the following decades, with concomitant development of culture and infrastructure. The construction of the federally funded National Road (which later became part of U.S. Route 40) and the private Baltimore and Ohio Railroad (B. & O.) made Baltimore a major shipping and manufacturing center by linking the city with major markets in the Midwest. By 1820 its population had reached 60,000, and its economy had shifted from its base in tobacco plantations to sawmilling, shipbuilding, and textile production. These industries benefited from war but successfully shifted into infrastructure development during peacetime.

Baltimore had one of the worst riots of the antebellum South in 1835, when bad investments led to the Baltimore bank riot. It was these riots that led to the city being nicknamed "Mobtown". Soon after the city created the world's first dental college, the Baltimore College of Dental Surgery, in 1840, and shared in the world's first telegraph line, between Baltimore and Washington, DC, in 1844.

Maryland, a slave state with limited popular support for secession, especially in the three counties of Southern Maryland, remained part of the Union during the American Civil War, following the 55-12 vote by the Maryland General Assembly against secession. Later, the Union's strategic occupation of the city in 1861 ensured Maryland would not further consider secession. The Union's capital, Washington, D.C., then in the state of Maryland, was well-situated to impede Baltimore and Maryland's communication or commerce with the Confederacy. Baltimore saw the first casualties of the war on April 19, 1861, when Union soldiers en route from the President Street Station to Camden Yards clashed with a secessionist mob in the Pratt Street riot.

In the midst of the Long Depression that followed the Panic of 1873, the Baltimore and Ohio Railroad company attempted to lower its workers' wages, leading to strikes and riots in the city and beyond. Strikers clashed with the National Guard, leaving 10 dead and 25 wounded. The beginnings of settlement movement work in Baltimore were made early in 1893, when Rev. Dr. Edward A. Lawrence took up lodgings with his friend Frank Thompson, in one of the Winans tenements, the Lawrence House being established shortly thereafter at 814-816 West Lombard Street.

20th century

On February 7, 1904, the Great Baltimore Fire destroyed over 1,500 buildings in 30 hours, leaving more than 70 blocks of the downtown area burned to the ground. Damages were estimated at $150 million in 1904 dollars. As the city rebuilt during the next two years, lessons learned from the fire led to improvements in firefighting equipment standards.

Baltimore lawyer Milton Dashiell advocated for an ordinance to bar African-Americans from moving into the Eutaw Place neighborhood in northwest Baltimore. He proposed to recognize majority white residential blocks and majority black residential blocks and to prevent people from moving into housing on such blocks where they would be a minority. The Baltimore Council passed the ordinance, and it became law on December 20, 1910, with Democratic Mayor J. Barry Mahool's signature. The Baltimore segregation ordinance was the first of its kind in the United States. Many other southern cities followed with their own segregation ordinances, though the US Supreme Court ruled against them in Buchanan v. Warley (1917).

The city grew in area by annexing new suburbs from the surrounding counties through 1918, when the city acquired portions of Baltimore County and Anne Arundel County. A state constitutional amendment, approved in 1948, required a special vote of the citizens in any proposed annexation area, effectively preventing any future expansion of the city's boundaries. Streetcars enabled the development of distant neighborhoods areas such as Edmonson Village whose residents could easily commute to work downtown.

Driven by migration from the deep South and by white suburbanization, the relative size of the city's black population grew from 23.8% in 1950 to 46.4% in 1970. Encouraged by real estate blockbusting techniques, recently settled white areas rapidly became all-black neighborhoods, in a rapid process which was nearly total by 1970.

The Baltimore riot of 1968, coinciding with uprisings in other cities, followed the assassination of Martin Luther King Jr. on April 4, 1968. Public order was not restored until April 12, 1968. The Baltimore uprising cost the city an estimated $10 million (US$  million in ). A total of 12,000 Maryland National Guard and federal troops were ordered into the city. The city experienced challenges again in 1974 when teachers, municipal workers, and police officers conducted strikes.

By the beginning of the 1970s, Baltimore's downtown area, known as the Inner Harbor, had been neglected and was occupied by a collection of abandoned warehouses. The nickname "Charm City" came from a 1975 meeting of advertisers seeking to improve the city's reputation. Efforts to redevelop the area started with the construction of the Maryland Science Center, which opened in 1976, the Baltimore World Trade Center (1977), and the Baltimore Convention Center (1979). Harborplace, an urban retail and restaurant complex, opened on the waterfront in 1980, followed by the National Aquarium, Maryland's largest tourist destination, and the Baltimore Museum of Industry in 1981. In 1995, the city opened the American Visionary Art Museum on Federal Hill. During the epidemic of HIV/AIDS in the United States, Baltimore City Health Department official Robert Mehl persuaded the city's mayor to form a committee to address food problems; the Baltimore-based charity Moveable Feast grew out of this initiative in 1990.

Baltimore has had a high homicide rate for several decades, peaking in 1993, and again in 2015. These deaths have taken an especially severe toll within the black community. Following the death of Freddie Gray in April 2015, the city experienced major protests and international media attention, as well as a clash between local youth and police that resulted in a state of emergency declaration and a curfew.

21st century
In 1992, the Baltimore Orioles baseball team moved from Memorial Stadium to Oriole Park at Camden Yards, located downtown near the harbor. Pope John Paul II held an open-air mass at Camden Yards during his papal visit to the United States in October 1995. Three years later the Baltimore Ravens football team moved into M&T Bank Stadium next to Camden Yards. By 2010, the organization's region of service had expanded from merely Baltimore to include all of the Eastern Shore of Maryland.

Baltimore has seen the reopening of the Hippodrome Theatre in 2004, the opening of the Reginald F. Lewis Museum of Maryland African American History & Culture in 2005, and the establishment of the National Slavic Museum in 2012. On April 12, 2012, Johns Hopkins held a dedication ceremony to mark the completion of one of the United States' largest medical complexes – the Johns Hopkins Hospital in Baltimore – which features the Sheikh Zayed Cardiovascular and Critical Care Tower and The Charlotte R. Bloomberg Children's Center. The event, held at the entrance to the $1.1 billion 1.6 million-square-foot-facility, honored the many donors including Sheikh Khalifa bin Zayed Al Nahyan, first president of the United Arab Emirates, and Michael Bloomberg.

On September 19, 2016, the Baltimore City Council approved a $660 million bond deal for the $5.5 billion Port Covington redevelopment project championed by Under Armour founder Kevin Plank and his real estate company Sagamore Development. Port Covington surpassed the Harbor Point development as the largest tax-increment financing deal in Baltimore's history and among the largest urban redevelopment projects in the country. The waterfront development that includes the new headquarters for Under Armour, as well as shops, housing, offices, and manufacturing spaces is projected to create 26,500 permanent jobs with a $4.3 billion annual economic impact. Goldman Sachs invested $233 million into the redevelopment project.

Geography
Baltimore is in north-central Maryland on the Patapsco River close to where it empties into the Chesapeake Bay. The city is also located on the fall line between the Piedmont Plateau and the Atlantic coastal plain, which divides Baltimore into "lower city" and "upper city".

The total area is 12.1 percent water.

Baltimore is almost surrounded by Baltimore County, but is politically independent of it. It is bordered by Anne Arundel County to the south.

Cityscape

Architecture

Baltimore exhibits examples from each period of architecture over more than two centuries, and work from architects such as Benjamin Latrobe, George A. Frederick, John Russell Pope, Mies van der Rohe and I. M. Pei.

The city is rich in architecturally significant buildings in a variety of styles. The Baltimore Basilica (1806–1821) is a neoclassical design by Benjamin Latrobe, and one of the oldest Catholic cathedrals in the United States. In 1813 Robert Cary Long Sr. built for Rembrandt Peale the first substantial structure in the United States designed expressly as a museum. Restored, it is now the Municipal Museum of Baltimore, or popularly the Peale Museum.

The McKim Free School was founded and endowed by John McKim. However, the building was erected by his son Isaac in 1822 after a design by William Howard and William Small. It reflects the popular interest in Greece when the nation was securing its independence and a scholarly interest in recently published drawings of Athenian antiquities.

It was constructed without the use of exterior scaffolding. The Sun Iron Building, designed by R.C. Hatfield in 1851, was the city's first iron-front building and was a model for a whole generation of downtown buildings. Brown Memorial Presbyterian Church, built in 1870 in memory of financier George Brown, has stained glass windows by Louis Comfort Tiffany and has been called "one of the most significant buildings in this city, a treasure of art and architecture" by Baltimore magazine.

The 1845 Greek Revival-style Lloyd Street Synagogue is one of the oldest synagogues in the United States. The Johns Hopkins Hospital, designed by Lt. Col. John S. Billings in 1876, was a considerable achievement for its day in functional arrangement and fireproofing.

The Harbor East area has seen the addition of two new towers which have completed construction: a 24-floor tower that is the new world headquarters of Legg Mason, and a 21-floor Four Seasons Hotel complex.

The streets of Baltimore are organized in a grid and spoke pattern, lined with tens of thousands of rowhouses. The mix of materials on the face of these rowhouses also give Baltimore its distinct look. The rowhouses are a mix of brick and formstone facings, a technology patented in 1937 by Albert Knight. John Waters characterized formstone as "the polyester of brick" in a 30-minute documentary film, Little Castles: A Formstone Phenomenon. In The Baltimore Rowhouse, Mary Ellen Hayward and Charles Belfoure considered the rowhouse as the architectural form defining Baltimore as "perhaps no other American city". In the mid-1790s, developers began building entire neighborhoods of the British-style rowhouses, which became the dominant house type of the city early in the 19th century.

Oriole Park at Camden Yards is a Major League Baseball park, opened in 1992, which was built as a retro style baseball park. Camden Yards, along with the National Aquarium, have helped revive the Inner Harbor from what once was an industrial district full of dilapidated warehouses into a bustling commercial district full of bars, restaurants and retail establishments.

After an international competition, the University of Baltimore School of Law awarded the German firm Behnisch Architekten 1st prize for its design, which was selected for the school's new home. After the building's opening in 2013, the design won additional honors including an ENR National "Best of the Best" Award.

Baltimore's newly rehabilitated Everyman Theatre was honored by the Baltimore Heritage at the 2013 Preservation Awards Celebration in 2013. Everyman Theatre will receive an Adaptive Reuse and Compatible Design Award as part of Baltimore Heritage's 2013 historic preservation awards ceremony. Baltimore Heritage is Baltimore's nonprofit historic and architectural preservation organization, which works to preserve and promote Baltimore's historic buildings and neighborhoods.

Tallest buildings

Neighborhoods

Baltimore is officially divided into nine geographical regions: North, Northeast, East, Southeast, South, Southwest, West, Northwest, and Central, with each district patrolled by a respective Baltimore Police Department. Interstate 83 and Charles Street down to Hanover Street and Ritchie Highway serve as the east–west dividing line and Eastern Avenue to Route 40 as the north–south dividing line; however, Baltimore Street is north–south dividing line for the U.S. Postal Service.

Central Baltimore
Central Baltimore, originally called the Middle District, stretches north of the Inner Harbor up to the edge of Druid Hill Park. Downtown Baltimore has mainly served as a commercial district with limited residential opportunities; however, between 2000 and 2010, the downtown population grew 130 percent as old commercial properties have been replaced by residential property. Still the city's main commercial area and business district, it includes Baltimore's sports complexes: Oriole Park at Camden Yards, M&T Bank Stadium, and the Royal Farms Arena; and the shops and attractions in the Inner Harbor: Harborplace, the Baltimore Convention Center, the National Aquarium, Maryland Science Center, Pier Six Pavilion, and Power Plant Live.

The University of Maryland, Baltimore, the University of Maryland Medical Center, and Lexington Market are also in the central district, as well as the Hippodrome and many nightclubs, bars, restaurants, shopping centers and various other attractions. The northern portion of Central Baltimore, between downtown and the Druid Hill Park, is home to many of the city's cultural opportunities. Maryland Institute College of Art, the Peabody Institute (music conservatory), George Peabody Library, Enoch Pratt Free Library – Central Library, the Lyric Opera House, the Joseph Meyerhoff Symphony Hall, the Walters Art Museum, the Maryland Center for History and Culture and its Enoch Pratt Mansion, and several galleries are located in this region.

North Baltimore

Several historic and notable neighborhoods are in this district: Govans (1755), Roland Park (1891), Guilford (1913), Homeland (1924), Hampden, Woodberry, Old Goucher (the original campus of Goucher College), and Jones Falls. Along the York Road corridor going north are the large neighborhoods of Charles Village, Waverly, and Mount Washington. The Station North Arts and Entertainment District is also located in North Baltimore.

South Baltimore

South Baltimore, a mixed industrial and residential area, consists of the "Old South Baltimore" peninsula below the Inner Harbor and east of the old B&O Railroad's Camden line tracks and Russell Street downtown. It is a culturally, ethnically, and socioeconomically diverse waterfront area with neighborhoods such as Locust Point and Riverside around a large park of the same name. Just south of the Inner Harbor, the historic Federal Hill neighborhood, is home to many working professionals, pubs and restaurants. At the end of the peninsula is historic Fort McHenry, a National Park since the end of World War I, when the old U.S. Army Hospital surrounding the 1798 star-shaped battlements was torn down.

Across the Hanover Street Bridge are residential areas such as Cherry Hill.

Northeast Baltimore
Northeast is primarily a residential neighborhood, home to Morgan State University, bounded by the city line of 1919 on its northern and eastern boundaries, Sinclair Lane, Erdman Avenue, and Pulaski Highway to the south and The Alameda on to the west. Also in this wedge of the city on 33rd Street is Baltimore City College high school, third oldest active public secondary school in the United States, founded downtown in 1839. Across Loch Raven Boulevard is the former site of the old Memorial Stadium home of the Baltimore Colts, Baltimore Orioles, and Baltimore Ravens, now replaced by a YMCA athletic and housing complex. Lake Montebello is in Northeast Baltimore.

East Baltimore
Located below Sinclair Lane and Erdman Avenue, above Orleans Street, East Baltimore is mainly made up of residential neighborhoods. This section of East Baltimore is home to Johns Hopkins Hospital, Johns Hopkins University School of Medicine, and Johns Hopkins Children's Center on Broadway. Notable neighborhoods include: Armistead Gardens, Broadway East, Barclay, Ellwood Park, Greenmount, and McElderry Park.

This area was the on-site film location for Homicide: Life on the Street, The Corner and The Wire.

Southeast Baltimore
Southeast Baltimore, located below Fayette Street, bordering the Inner Harbor and the Northwest Branch of the Patapsco River to the west, the city line of 1919 on its eastern boundaries and the Patapsco River to the south, is a mixed industrial and residential area. Patterson Park, the "Best Backyard in Baltimore", as well as the Highlandtown Arts District, and Johns Hopkins Bayview Medical Center are located in Southeast Baltimore. The Shops at Canton Crossing opened in 2013. The Canton neighborhood, is located along Baltimore's prime waterfront. Other historic neighborhoods include: Fells Point, Patterson Park, Butchers Hill, Highlandtown, Greektown, Harbor East, Little Italy, and Upper Fell's Point.

Northwest Baltimore
Northwestern is bounded by the county line to the north and west, Gwynns Falls Parkway on the south and Pimlico Road on the east, is home to Pimlico Race Course, Sinai Hospital, and the headquarters of the NAACP. Its neighborhoods are mostly residential and are dissected by Northern Parkway. The area has been the center of Baltimore's Jewish community since after World War II. Notable neighborhoods include: Pimlico, Mount Washington, and Cheswolde, and Park Heights.

West Baltimore
West Baltimore is west of downtown and the Martin Luther King Jr. Boulevard and is bounded by Gwynns Falls Parkway, Fremont Avenue, and West Baltimore Street. The Old West Baltimore Historic District includes the neighborhoods of Harlem Park, Sandtown-Winchester, Druid Heights, Madison Park, and Upton. Originally a predominantly German neighborhood, by the last half of the 19th century, Old West Baltimore was home to a substantial section of the city's Black population.

It became the largest neighborhood for the city's Black community and its cultural, political, and economic center. Coppin State University, Mondawmin Mall, and Edmondson Village are located in this district. The area's crime problems have provided subject material for television series, such as The Wire. Local organizations, such as the Sandtown Habitat for Humanity and the Upton Planning Committee, have been steadily transforming parts of formerly blighted areas of West Baltimore into clean, safe communities.

Southwest Baltimore
Southwest Baltimore is bound by the Baltimore County line to the west, West Baltimore Street to the north, and Martin Luther King Jr. Boulevard and Russell Street/Baltimore-Washington Parkway (Maryland Route 295) to the east. Notable neighborhoods in Southwest Baltimore include: Pigtown, Carrollton Ridge, Ridgely's Delight, Leakin Park, Violetville, Lakeland, and Morrell Park.

St. Agnes Hospital on Wilkens and Caton avenues is located in this district with the neighboring Cardinal Gibbons High School, which is the former site of Babe Ruth's alma mater, St. Mary's Industrial School. Through this segment of Baltimore ran the beginnings of the historic National Road, which was constructed beginning in 1806 along Old Frederick Road and continuing into the county on Frederick Road into Ellicott City, Maryland. Other sides in this district are: Carroll Park, one of the city's largest parks, the colonial Mount Clare Mansion, and Washington Boulevard, which dates to pre-Revolutionary War days as the prime route out of the city to Alexandria, Virginia, and Georgetown on the Potomac River.

Adjacent communities
The City of Baltimore is bordered by the following communities, all unincorporated census-designated places.

Climate
Baltimore has a humid subtropical climate (Cfa) in the Köppen climate classification, with long, hot summers, cool winters, and a summer peak to annual precipitation. Baltimore is part of USDA plant hardiness zones 7b and 8a. Summers are normally warm, with occasional late day thunderstorms.

Spring and autumn are mild, with spring being the wettest season in terms of the number of precipitation days. The combination of heat and humidity leads to occasional thunderstorms. A southeasterly bay breeze off the Chesapeake often occurs on summer afternoons when hot air rises over inland areas. Prevailing winds from the southwest interacting with this breeze as well as the city proper's UHI can seriously exacerbate air quality. In late summer and early autumn the track of hurricanes or their remnants may cause flooding in downtown Baltimore, despite the city being far removed from the typical coastal storm surge areas.

It varies greatly by year, with some seasons seeing only trace accumulations of snow, while others see several major Nor'easters. Owing to lessened urban heat island (UHI) as compared to the city proper and distance from the moderating Chesapeake Bay, the outlying and inland parts of the Baltimore metro area are usually cooler, especially at night, than the city proper and the coastal towns.

It is by no means uncommon for the rain-snow line to set up in the metro area. Freezing rain and sleet occur a few times some winters in the area, as warm air overrides cold air at the low to mid-levels of the atmosphere. When the wind blows from the east, the cold air gets dammed against the mountains to the west and the result is freezing rain or sleet.

Like all of Maryland, Baltimore is at risk for increased impacts of climate change. Historically, flooding has ruined houses and almost killed people, especially in lower income majority Black neighborhoods, and caused sewage backups, given the existing disrepair of Baltimore's water system.

Demographics

Population

In 2011, then-Mayor Stephanie Rawlings-Blake said her main goal was to increase the city's population by improving city services to reduce the number of people leaving the city and by passing legislation protecting immigrants' rights to stimulate growth. Baltimore is sometimes identified as a sanctuary city. In 2019, then-Mayor Jack Young said that Baltimore will not assist ICE agents with immigration raids.

Baltimore City's population has declined overall from 2010 to 2020 by about 34,830 people, representing a 5.6% drop. The official US census places the city's population at 585,708 for 2020. The year between 2018 and 2019 had the largest year-to-year population loss, and in 2020 Baltimore lost more population than any other major city in the United States.

Gentrification has increased since the 2000 census, primarily in East Baltimore, downtown, and Central Baltimore, with 14.8% of census tracts having had income growth and home values appreciation at a rate higher than the city overall. Most, but not all, gentrifying neighborhoods are predominantly white areas which have seen a turnover from lower income to higher income households. These areas represent either expansion of existing gentrified areas, or activity around the Inner Harbor, downtown, or the Johns Hopkins Homewood campus. In some neighborhoods in East Baltimore, the Hispanic population has increased along with home values and income, while both the non-Hispanic white and non-Hispanic black populations have declined, a trend which is not seen in many other American cities.

After New York City, Baltimore was the second city in the United States to reach a population of 100,000. From the 1820 through 1850 U.S. censuses, Baltimore was the second most-populous city, before being surpassed by Philadelphia in 1860. It was among the top 10 cities in population in the United States in every census up through the 1980 census, and after World War II had a population of nearly 1 million.

Characteristics

Across races, 4.2% of the population are of Hispanic, Latino, or Spanish origin (1.63% Salvadoran, 1.21% Mexican, 0.63% Puerto Rican, 0.6% Honduran). 

As per the 2020 Census, 8.1% of residents between 2016 and 2020 were foreign born persons. Females made up 53.4% of the population. The median age was 35 years old, with 22.4% under 18 years old, 65.8% from 18 to 64 years old, and 11.8% 65 or older.

Baltimore has a large Caribbean American population, with the largest groups being Jamaicans and Trinidadians. Baltimore's Jamaican community is largely centered in the Park Heights neighborhood, but generations of immigrants have also lived in Southeast Baltimore.

In 2005, approximately 30,778 people (6.5%) identified as gay, lesbian, or bisexual. In 2012, same-sex marriage in Maryland was legalized, going into effect January 1, 2013.

Income and housing
Between 2016 and 2020, the median household was $52,164 and the median income per capita to $32,699, compared to the national averages of $64,994 and $35,384, respectively. In 2009, the median household income was $42,241 and the median income per capita was $25,707, compared to the national median income of $53,889 per household and $28,930 per capita. 

In 2009, 23.7% of the population lived below the poverty line, compared to 13.5% nationwide. In the 2020 Census, 20% of Baltimore residents were living in poverty, compared to 11.6% nationwide.

Housing in Baltimore is relatively inexpensive for large, coastal cities of its size. The median sale price for homes in Baltimore as of December 2022 was $209,000, up from $95,000 in 2012. Despite the housing collapse, and along with the national trends, Baltimore residents still faced slowly increasing rent (up 3% in the summer of 2010). The median value of owner-occupied housing units between 2016 and 2020 was $242,499.

The homeless population in Baltimore is steadily increasing; it exceeded 4,000 people in 2011. The increase in the number of young homeless people was particularly severe.

Life expectancy
As of 2015, life expectancy in Baltimore was 74 to 75 years, compared to the U.S. average of 78 to 80. Fourteen neighborhoods had lower life expectancies than North Korea. The life expectancy in Downtown/Seton Hill was comparable to that of Yemen.

Religion

In 2015, 25% of adults in Baltimore reported affiliation with no religion. 50% of the adult population of Baltimore are Protestants. Catholicism is the second largest religious affiliation, comprising 15% percent of the population, followed by Judaism (3%) and Islam (2%). Around 1% identify with other Christian denominations.

Languages
, 91% (526,705) of Baltimore residents five years old and older spoke only English at home. Close to 4% (21,661) spoke Spanish. Other languages, such as African languages, French, and Chinese are spoken by less than 1% of the population.

Crime

Crime in Baltimore, generally concentrated in areas high in poverty, has been extreme for many years. Overall reported crime has dropped by 60% from the mid-1990s to the mid-2010s, but homicide rates remain high and exceed the national average. The worst years for crime in Baltimore overall were from 1993 to 1996; with 96,243 crimes reported in 1995. Baltimore's 344 homicides in 2015 represented the highest homicide rate in the city's recorded history—52.5 per 100,000 people, surpassing the record set in 1993—and the second-highest for U.S. cities behind St. Louis and ahead of Detroit. Of Baltimore's 344 homicides in 2015, 321 (93.3%) of the victims were African-American. 

Drug use and deaths by drug use (particularly drugs used intravenously, such as heroin) are a related problem which has impaired Baltimore for decades. Among cities greater than 400,000, Baltimore ranked 2nd in its opiate drug death rate in the United States. The DEA reported that 10% of Baltimore's population – about 64,000 people – are addicted to heroin, most of which is trafficked into the city from New York.

In 2011, Baltimore police reported 196 homicides, the lowest number in the city since 197 homicides in 1978 and far lower than the peak homicide count of 353 slayings in 1993. City leaders at the time credited a sustained focus on repeat violent offenders and increased community engagement for the continued drop, reflecting a nationwide decline in crime.

On August 8, 2014, Baltimore's new youth curfew law went into effect. It prohibits unaccompanied children under age 14 from being on the streets after 9 p.m. and those aged 14–16 from being out after 10 p.m. during the week and 11 p.m. on weekends and during the summer. The goal is to keep children out of dangerous places and reduce crime.

Crime in Baltimore reached another peak in 2015 when the year's tally of 344 homicides was second only to the record 353 in 1993, when Baltimore had about 100,000 more residents. The killings in 2015 were on pace with recent years in the early months of 2015 but skyrocketed after the unrest and rioting of late April following the killing of Freddie Gray by police. In five of the next eight months, killings topped 30–40 per month. Nearly 90 percent of 2015's homicides resulted from shootings, renewing calls for new gun laws. In 2016, according to annual crime statistics released by the Baltimore Police Department, there were 318 murders in the city. This total marked a 7.56 percent decline in homicides from 2015.

In an interview with The Guardian, on November 2, 2017, David Simon, himself a former police reporter for The Baltimore Sun, ascribed the most recent surge in murders to the high-profile decision by Baltimore state's attorney, Marilyn Mosby, to charge six city police officers following the death of Freddie Gray after he was paralyzed during a "rough-ride" in a police van while in police custody in April 2015, dying from the injury a week later. "What Mosby basically did was send a message to the Baltimore police department: 'I'm going to put you in jail for making a bad arrest.' So officers figured it out: 'I can go to jail for making the wrong arrest, so I'm not getting out of my car to clear a corner,' and that's exactly what happened post-Freddie Gray."

In Baltimore, "arrest numbers have plummeted from more than 40,000 in 2014, the year before Gray's death and the charges against the officers, to about 18,000 [as of November 2017]. This happened as homicides soared from 211 in 2014 to 344 in 2015 – an increase of 63%." Simon's HBO miniseries We Own This City aired in April 2022 and covered many of the events surrounding the death of Freddie Gray and the work slowdown by the Baltimore Police Department during that time period.

In 2022, Baltimore tallied 335 homicides.

Economy
Once a predominantly industrial town, with an economic base focused on steel processing, shipping, auto manufacturing (General Motors Baltimore Assembly), and transportation, the city experienced deindustrialization, which cost residents tens of thousands of low-skill, high-wage jobs. The city now relies on a low-wage service economy, which accounts for 31% of jobs in the city.
Around the turn of the 20th century, Baltimore was the leading U.S. manufacturer of rye whiskey and straw hats. It also led in refining of crude oil, brought to the city by pipeline from Pennsylvania.

 the U.S. Bureau of Labor Statistics calculated Baltimore's unemployment rate at 5.8% while one quarter of Baltimore residents (and 37% of Baltimore children) live in poverty. The 2012 closure of a major steel plant at Sparrows Point is expected to have a further impact on employment and the local economy. The Census Bureau reported in 2013 that 207,000 workers commute into Baltimore city each day. Downtown Baltimore is the primary economic asset within Baltimore City and the region with 29.1 million square feet of office space. The tech sector is rapidly growing as the Baltimore metro ranks 8th in the CBRE Tech Talent Report among 50 U.S. metro areas for high growth rate and number of tech professionals. Forbes ranked Baltimore fourth among America's "new tech hot spots".

The city is home to the Johns Hopkins Hospital. Other large companies in Baltimore include Under Armour, BRT Laboratories, Cordish Company, Legg Mason, McCormick & Company, T. Rowe Price, and Royal Farms. A sugar refinery owned by American Sugar Refining is one of Baltimore's cultural icons. Nonprofits based in Baltimore include Lutheran Services in America and Catholic Relief Services.

Almost a quarter of the jobs in the Baltimore region were in science, technology, engineering, and math as of mid-2013, a fact attributed in part to the city's extensive undergraduate and graduate schools; maintenance and repair experts were included in this count.

Port
The center of international commerce for the region is the World Trade Center Baltimore. It houses the Maryland Port Administration and U.S. headquarters for major shipping lines. Baltimore is ranked 9th for total dollar value of cargo and 13th for cargo tonnage for all U.S. ports. In 2014, total cargo moving through the port totaled 29.5 million tons, down from 30.3 million tons in 2013. The value of cargo traveling through the port in 2014 came to $52.5 billion, down from $52.6 billion in 2013. The Port of Baltimore generates $3 billion in annual wages and salary, as well as supporting 14,630 direct jobs and 108,000 jobs connected to port work. In 2014, the port also generated more than $300 million in taxes. It serves over 50 ocean carriers making nearly 1,800 annual visits. Among all U.S. ports, Baltimore is first in handling automobiles, light trucks, farm and construction machinery; and imported forest products, aluminum, and sugar. The port is second in coal exports. The Port of Baltimore's cruise industry, which offers year-round trips on several lines supports over 500 jobs and brings in over $90 million to Maryland's economy annually. Growth at the port continues with the Maryland Port Administration plans to turn the southern tip of the former steel mill into a marine terminal, primarily for car and truck shipments, but also for anticipated new business coming to Baltimore after the completion of the Panama Canal expansion project.

Tourism
Baltimore's history and attractions have made it a popular tourist destination. In 2014, the city hosted 24.5 million visitors, who spent $5.2 billion. The Baltimore Visitor Center, which is operated by Visit Baltimore, is located on Light Street in the Inner Harbor. Much of the city's tourism centers around the Inner Harbor, with the National Aquarium being Maryland's top tourist destination. Baltimore Harbor's restoration has made it "a city of boats", with several historic ships and other attractions on display and open to the public. The USS Constellation, the last Civil War-era vessel afloat, is docked at the head of the Inner Harbor; the USS Torsk, a submarine that holds the Navy's record for dives (more than 10,000); and the Coast Guard cutter WHEC-37, the last surviving U.S. warship that was in Pearl Harbor during the Japanese attack on December 7, 1941, and which engaged Japanese Zero aircraft during the battle.

Also docked is the lightship Chesapeake, which for decades marked the entrance to Chesapeake Bay; and the Seven Foot Knoll Lighthouse, the oldest surviving screw-pile lighthouse on Chesapeake Bay, which once marked the mouth of the Patapsco River and the entrance to Baltimore. All of these attractions are owned and maintained by the Historic Ships in Baltimore organization. The Inner Harbor is also the home port of Pride of Baltimore II, the state of Maryland's "goodwill ambassador" ship, a reconstruction of a famous Baltimore Clipper ship.

Other tourist destinations include sporting venues such as Oriole Park at Camden Yards, M&T Bank Stadium, and Pimlico Race Course, Fort McHenry, the Mount Vernon, Federal Hill, and Fells Point neighborhoods, Lexington Market, Horseshoe Casino, and museums such as the Walters Art Museum, the Baltimore Museum of Industry, the Babe Ruth Birthplace and Museum, the Maryland Science Center, and the B&O Railroad Museum.

Culture

Historically a working-class port town, Baltimore has sometimes been dubbed a "city of neighborhoods", with 72 designated historic districts traditionally occupied by distinct ethnic groups. Most notable today are three downtown areas along the port: the Inner Harbor, frequented by tourists because of its hotels, shops, and museums; Fells Point, once a favorite entertainment spot for sailors but now refurbished and gentrified (and featured in the movie Sleepless in Seattle); and Little Italy, located between the other two, where Baltimore's Italian-American community is based – and where U.S. House Speaker Nancy Pelosi grew up. Further inland, Mount Vernon is the traditional center of cultural and artistic life of the city; it is home to a distinctive Washington Monument, set atop a hill in a 19th-century urban square, that predates the monument in Washington, D.C. by several decades. Baltimore also has a significant German American population, and was the second largest port of immigration to the United States, behind Ellis Island in New York and New Jersey. Between 1820 and 1989, almost 2 million who were German, Polish, English, Irish, Russian, Lithuanian, French, Ukrainian, Czech, Greek and Italian came to Baltimore, most between the years 1861 to 1930. By 1913, when Baltimore was averaging forty thousand immigrants per year, World War I closed off the flow of immigrants. By 1970, Baltimore's heyday as an immigration center was a distant memory. There also was a Chinatown dating back to at least the 1880s which consisted of no more than 400 Chinese residents. A local Chinese-American association remains based there, but only one Chinese restaurant as of 2009.

Baltimore has quite a history when it comes to making beer, an art that thrived in Baltimore from the 1800s to the 1950s with over 100 old breweries in the city's past. The best remaining example of that history is the old American Brewery Building on North Gay Street and the National Brewing Company building in the Brewer's Hill neighborhood. In the 1940s the National Brewing Company introduced the nation's first six-pack. National's two most prominent brands, were National Bohemian Beer colloquially "Natty Boh" and Colt 45. Listed on the Pabst website as a "Fun Fact", Colt 45 was named after running back #45 Jerry Hill of the 1963 Baltimore Colts and not the .45 caliber handgun ammunition round. Both brands are still made today, albeit outside of Maryland, and served all around the Baltimore area at bars, as well as Orioles and Ravens games. The Natty Boh logo appears on all cans, bottles, and packaging; and merchandise featuring him can still easily be found in shops in Maryland, including several in Fells Point.

Each year the Artscape takes place in the city in the Bolton Hill neighborhood, close to the Maryland Institute College of Art. Artscape styles itself as the "largest free arts festival in America". Each May, the Maryland Film Festival takes place in Baltimore, using all five screens of the historic Charles Theatre as its anchor venue. Many movies and television shows have been filmed in Baltimore. Homicide: Life on the Street was set and filmed in Baltimore, as well as The Wire. House of Cards and Veep are set in Washington, D.C. but filmed in Baltimore.

Baltimore has cultural museums in many areas of study. The Baltimore Museum of Art, and the Walters Art Museum are internationally renowned for its collection of art. The Baltimore Museum of Art has the largest holding of works by Henri Matisse in the world. The American Visionary Art Museum has been designated by Congress as America's national museum for visionary art. The National Great Blacks In Wax Museum is the first African American wax museum in the country, featuring more than 150 life-size and lifelike wax figures.

Cuisine
Baltimore is known for its Maryland blue crabs, crab cake, Old Bay Seasoning, pit beef, and the "chicken box". The city has many restaurants in or around the Inner Harbor. The most known and acclaimed are the Charleston, Woodberry Kitchen, and the Charm City Cakes bakery featured on the Food Network's Ace of Cakes. The Little Italy neighborhood's biggest draw is the food. Fells Point also is a foodie neighborhood for tourists and locals and is where the oldest continuously running tavern in the country, "The Horse You Came in on Saloon", is located. Many of the city's upscale restaurants can be found in Harbor East. Five public markets are located across the city. The Baltimore Public Market System is the oldest continuously operating public market system in the United States. Lexington Market is one of the longest-running markets in the world and longest running in the country, having been around since 1782. The market continues to stand at its original site. Baltimore is the last place in America where one can still find arabbers, vendors who sell fresh fruits and vegetables from a horse-drawn cart that goes up and down neighborhood streets. Food- and drink-rating site Zagat ranked Baltimore second in a list of the 17 best food cities in the country in 2015.

Local dialect

Baltimore city, along with its surrounding regions, is home to a unique local dialect known as the Baltimore dialect. It is part of the larger Mid-Atlantic American English group and is noted to be very similar to the Philadelphia dialect.

The so-called "Bawlmerese" accent is known for its characteristic pronunciation of its long "o" vowel, in which an "eh" sound is added before the long "o" sound (/oʊ/ shifts to [ɘʊ], or even [eʊ]). It also adopts Philadelphia's pattern of the short "a" sound, such that the tensed vowel in words like "bath" or "ask" does not match the more relaxed one in "sad" or "act".

Baltimore native John Waters parodies the city and its dialect extensively in his films. Most are filmed in Baltimore, including the 1972 cult classic Pink Flamingos, as well as Hairspray and its Broadway musical remake.

Performing arts

Baltimore has four state-designated arts and entertainment (A & E) districts. The Pennsylvania Avenue Black Arts & Entertainment District, Station North Arts and Entertainment District, Highlandtown Arts District, and the Bromo Arts & Entertainment District. 

The Baltimore Office of Promotion & The Arts, a non-profit organization, produces events and arts programs as well as managing several facilities. It is the official Baltimore City Arts Council. BOPA coordinates Baltimore's major events, including New Year's Eve and July 4 celebrations at the Inner Harbor, Artscape, which is America's largest free arts festival, Baltimore Book Festival, Baltimore Farmers' Market & Bazaar, School 33 Art Center's Open Studio Tour, and the Dr. Martin Luther King Jr. Parade.

The Baltimore Symphony Orchestra is an internationally renowned orchestra, founded in 1916 as a publicly funded municipal organization. Its most recent music director was Marin Alsop, a protégé of Leonard Bernstein's. Centerstage is the premier theater company in the city and a regionally well-respected group. The Lyric Opera House is the home of Lyric Opera Baltimore, which operates there as part of the Patricia and Arthur Modell Performing Arts Center. The Baltimore Consort has been a leading early music ensemble for over twenty-five years. The France-Merrick Performing Arts Center, home of the restored Thomas W. Lamb-designed Hippodrome Theatre, has afforded Baltimore the opportunity to become a major regional player in the area of touring Broadway and other performing arts presentations. Renovating Baltimore's historic theatres has become widespread throughout the city; renovated theatres include the Everyman, Centre, Senator, and most recently Parkway Theatre. Other buildings have been reused; these include the former Mercantile Deposit and Trust Company bank building, which is now The Chesapeake Shakespeare Company Theater.

Baltimore also boasts a wide array of professional (non-touring) and community theater groups. Aside from Center Stage, resident troupes in the city include The Vagabond Players, the oldest continuously operating community theater group in the country, Everyman Theatre, Single Carrot Theatre, and Baltimore Theatre Festival. Community theaters in the city include Fells Point Community Theatre and the Arena Players Inc., which is the nation's oldest continuously operating African American community theater. In 2009, the Baltimore Rock Opera Society, an all-volunteer theatrical company, launched its first production.

Baltimore is home to the Pride of Baltimore Chorus, a three-time international silver medalist women's chorus, affiliated with Sweet Adelines International. The Maryland State Boychoir is located in the northeastern Baltimore neighborhood of Mayfield.

Baltimore is the home of non-profit chamber music organization Vivre Musicale. VM won a 2011–2012 award for Adventurous Programming from the American Society of Composers, Authors and Publishers and Chamber Music America.

The Peabody Institute, located in the Mount Vernon neighborhood, is the oldest conservatory of music in the United States. Established in 1857, it is one of the most prestigious in the world, along with Juilliard, Eastman, and the Curtis Institute. The Morgan State University Choir is also one of the nation's most prestigious university choral ensembles. The city is home to the Baltimore School for the Arts, a public high school in the Mount Vernon neighborhood of Baltimore. The institution is nationally recognized for its success in preparation for students entering music (vocal/instrumental), theatre (acting/theater production), dance, and visual arts.

In 1981, Baltimore hosted the first International Theater Festival, the first such festival in the country. Executive producer Al Kraizer staged 66 performances of nine shows by international theatre companies, including from Ireland, the United Kingdom, South Africa and Israel. However, the festival proved to be expensive to mount, and the following year the festival was hosted in Denver, called the World Theatre Festival, at the Denver Center for Performing Arts, after the city had asked Kraizer to organize it.

In June 1986, the 20th Theatre of Nations, sponsored by the International Theatre Institute, was held in Baltimore – the first time it had been held in the U.S.

Sports

Baseball

Baltimore has a long and storied baseball history, including its distinction as the birthplace of Babe Ruth in 1895. The original 19th century Baltimore Orioles were one of the most successful early franchises, featuring numerous hall of famers during its years from 1882 to 1899.
As one of the eight inaugural American League franchises, the Baltimore Orioles played in the AL during the 1901 and 1902 seasons. The team moved to New York City before the 1903 season and was renamed the New York Highlanders, which later became the New York Yankees.
Ruth played for the minor league Baltimore Orioles team, which was active from 1903 to 1914. After playing one season in 1915 as the Richmond Climbers, the team returned the following year to Baltimore, where it played as the Orioles until 1953.

The team currently known as the Baltimore Orioles has represented Major League Baseball locally since 1954 when the St. Louis Browns moved to the city of Baltimore. The Orioles advanced to the World Series in 1966, 1969, 1970, 1971, 1979 and 1983, winning three times (1966, 1970 and 1983), while making the playoffs all but one year (1972) from 1969 through 1974.

In 1995, local player (and later Hall of Famer) Cal Ripken Jr. broke Lou Gehrig's streak of 2,130 consecutive games played, for which Ripken was named Sportsman of the Year by Sports Illustrated magazine. Six former Orioles players, including Ripken (2007), and two of the team's managers have been inducted into the Baseball Hall of Fame.

Since 1992, the Orioles' home ballpark has been Oriole Park at Camden Yards, which has been hailed as one of the league's best since it opened.

Football

Prior to an NFL team moving to Baltimore, there had been several attempts at a professional football team prior to the 1950s, which were blocked by the Washington team and its NFL friends. Most were minor league or semi-professional teams. The first major league to base a team in Baltimore was the All-America Football Conference (AAFC), which had a team named the Baltimore Colts. The AAFC Colts played for three seasons in the AAFC (1947, 1948, and 1949), and when the AAFC folded following the 1949 season, moved to the NFL for a single year (1950) before going bankrupt. Three years later, the NFL's Dallas Texans would itself fold. Its assets and player contracts purchased by an ownership team headed by Baltimore businessman Carroll Rosenbloom, who moved the team to Baltimore, establishing a new team also named the Baltimore Colts. During the 1950s and 1960s, the Colts were one of the NFLs more successful franchises, led by Pro Football Hall of Fame quarterback Johnny Unitas who set a then-record of 47 consecutive games with a touchdown pass. The Colts advanced to the NFL Championship twice (1958 & 1959) and Super Bowl twice (1969 & 1971), winning all except Super Bowl III in 1969. After the 1983 season, the team left Baltimore for Indianapolis in 1984, where they became the Indianapolis Colts.

The NFL returned to Baltimore when the former Cleveland Browns moved to Baltimore to become the Baltimore Ravens in 1996. Since then, the Ravens won a Super Bowl championship in 2000 and 2012, six AFC North division championships (2003, 2006, 2011, 2012, 2018, and 2019), and appeared in four AFC Championship Games (2000, 2008, 2011 and 2012).

Baltimore also hosted a Canadian Football League franchise, the Baltimore Stallions for the 1994 and 1995 seasons. Following the 1995 season, and ultimate end to the Canadian Football League in the United States experiment, the team was sold and relocated to Montreal.

Other teams and events

The first professional sports organization in the United States, The Maryland Jockey Club, was formed in Baltimore in 1743. Preakness Stakes, the second race in the United States Triple Crown of Thoroughbred Racing, has been held every May at Pimlico Race Course in Baltimore since 1873.

College lacrosse is a common sport in the spring, as the Johns Hopkins Blue Jays men's lacrosse team has won 44 national championships, the most of any program in history. In addition, Loyola University won its first men's NCAA lacrosse championship in 2012.

The Baltimore Blast are a professional arena soccer team that play in the Major Arena Soccer League at the SECU Arena on the campus of Towson University. The Blast have won nine championships in various leagues, including the MASL. A previous entity of the Blast played in the Major Indoor Soccer League from 1980 to 1992, winning one championship. The Baltimore Kings, a Baltimore Blast affiliate, joined MASL 3 in 2021 to begin play in 2022.

FC Baltimore 1729 was a semi-professional soccer club in the NPSL league, with the goal of bringing a community-oriented competitive soccer experience to the city of Baltimore. Their inaugural season started on May 11, 2018, and they played their home games at CCBC Essex Field.

The Baltimore Blues were a semi-professional rugby league club which began competition in the USA Rugby League in 2012. The Baltimore Bohemians were an American soccer club which competed in the USL Premier Development League, the fourth tier of the American Soccer Pyramid. Their inaugural season started in the spring of 2012.

The Baltimore Grand Prix debuted along the streets of the Inner Harbor section of the city's downtown on September 2–4, 2011. The event played host to the American Le Mans Series on Saturday and the IndyCar Series on Sunday. Support races from smaller series were also held, including Indy Lights. After three consecutive years, on September 13, 2013, it was announced that the event would not be held in 2014 or 2015 due to scheduling conflicts.

The athletic equipment company Under Armour is also based out of Baltimore. Founded in 1996 by Kevin Plank, a University of Maryland alumnus, the company's headquarters are located in Tide Point, adjacent to Fort McHenry and the Domino Sugar factory. The Baltimore Marathon is the flagship race of several races. The marathon begins at the Camden Yards sports complex and travels through many diverse neighborhoods of Baltimore, including the scenic Inner Harbor waterfront area, historic Federal Hill, Fells Point, and Canton, Baltimore. The race then proceeds to other important focal points of the city such as Patterson Park, Clifton Park, Lake Montebello, the Charles Village neighborhood and the western edge of downtown. After winding through 42.195 kilometres (26.219 mi) of Baltimore, the race ends at virtually the same point at which it starts.

The Baltimore Brigade were an Arena Football League team based in Baltimore that from 2017 to 2019 played at Royal Farms Arena. The team ceased operations along with the league in 2019.

Parks and recreation
The Baltimore City Department of Recreation and Parks manages the majority of parks and recreational facilities in the city including Patterson Park, Federal Hill Park, and Druid Hill Park. The city is also home to Fort McHenry National Monument and Historic Shrine, a coastal star-shaped fort best known for its role in the War of 1812. , The Trust for Public Land, a national land conservation organization, ranks Baltimore 40th among the 75 largest U.S. cities.

Politics and government
Baltimore is an independent city, and not part of any county. For most governmental purposes under Maryland law, Baltimore City is treated as a county-level entity. The United States Census Bureau uses counties as the basic unit for presentation of statistical information in the United States, and treats Baltimore as a county equivalent for those purposes.

Baltimore has been a Democratic stronghold for over 150 years, with Democrats dominating every level of government. In virtually all elections, the Democratic primary is the real contest. As of the 2020 elections, registered Democrats outnumbered registered Republicans by almost 10-to-1. No Republican has been elected to the City Council since 1939, and the city's last Republican mayor, Theodore McKeldin, left office in 1967. No Republican candidate since then has received 25 percent or more of the vote. In the 2016 and 2020 mayoral elections, the Republicans were pushed into third place by write-in and independent candidates, respectively. The last Republican candidate for president to win the city was Dwight Eisenhower in his successful reelection bid in 1956.

The city hosted the first six Democratic National Conventions, from 1832 through 1852, and hosted the DNC again in 1860, 1872, and 1912.

City government

Mayor

Brandon Scott is the current mayor of Baltimore. He was elected in 2020 and took office on December 8, 2020. Scott succeeded Jack Young who had been mayor since May 2, 2019, upon the resignation of Catherine Pugh. Prior to Pugh's official resignation, Young was the president of the Baltimore City Council and had been the acting mayor since April 2.

Catherine Pugh became the Democratic nominee for mayor in 2016 and won the mayoral election in 2016 with 57.1% of the vote; Pugh took office as mayor on December 6, 2016. Pugh took a leave of absence in April 2019 due to health concerns, then officially resigned from office on May 2. The resignation coincided with a scandal over a "self-dealing" book-sales arrangement.

Stephanie Rawlings-Blake assumed the office of Mayor on February 4, 2010, when predecessor Dixon's resignation became effective. Rawlings-Blake had been serving as City Council President at the time. She was elected to a full term in 2011, defeating Pugh in the primary election and receiving 84% of the vote.

Sheila Dixon became the first female mayor of Baltimore on January 17, 2007. As the former City Council President, she assumed the office of Mayor when former Mayor Martin O'Malley took office as Governor of Maryland. On November 6, 2007, Dixon won the Baltimore mayoral election. Mayor Dixon's administration ended less than three years after her election, the result of a criminal investigation that began in 2006 while she was still City Council President. She was convicted on a single misdemeanor charge of embezzlement on December 1, 2009. A month later, Dixon made an Alford plea to a perjury charge and agreed to resign from office; Maryland, like most states, does not allow convicted felons to hold office.

Baltimore City Council
Grassroots pressure for reform, voiced as Question P, restructured the city council in November 2002, against the will of the mayor, the council president, and the majority of the council. A coalition of union and community groups, organized by the Association of Community Organizations for Reform Now (ACORN), backed the effort.

The Baltimore City Council is now made up of 14 single-member districts and one elected at-large council president. Current members of the council are Nick Mosby, Danielle McCray, Zeke Cohen, Ryan Dorsey, Mark Conway, Isaac Schleifer, Sharon Middleton, James Torrence, Kristerfer Burnett, John Bullock, Phylicia Porter, Eric Costello, Robert Stokes, Sr., Antonio Glover, and Odette Ramos. Nick Mosby has been the council president since November 2020, when he was elected to succeed the role from Mayor Brandon Scott.

Law enforcement
The Baltimore City Police Department, founded 1784 as a "Night City Watch" and day Constables system and later reorganized as a City Department in 1853, with a following reorganization under State of Maryland supervision in 1859, with appointments made by the Governor of Maryland after a disturbing period of civic and elections violence with riots in the later part of the decade, is the current primary law enforcement agency serving the citizens of the City of Baltimore. Campus and building security for the city's public schools is provided by the Baltimore City Public Schools Police, established in the 1970s.

In the period of 2011–2015, 120 lawsuits were brought against Baltimore police for alleged brutality and misconduct. The Freddie Gray settlement of $6.4 million exceeds the combined total settlements of the 120 lawsuits, as state law caps such payments.

The Maryland Transportation Authority Police under the Maryland Department of Transportation, (originally established as the "Baltimore Harbor Tunnel Police" when opened in 1957) is the primary law enforcement agency on the Fort McHenry Tunnel Thruway (Interstate 95), the Baltimore Harbor Tunnel Thruway (Interstate 895), which go under the Northwest Branch of the Patapsco River, and Interstate 395, which has three ramp bridges crossing the Middle Branch of the Patapsco River which are under MdTA jurisdiction, the Baltimore-Washington International Airport, (BWI) and have limited concurrent jurisdiction with the Baltimore City Police Department under a "memorandum of understanding".

Law enforcement on the fleet of transit buses and transit rail systems serving Baltimore is the responsibility of the Maryland Transit Administration Police, which is part of the Maryland Transit Administration of the state Department of Transportation. The MTA Police also share jurisdiction authority with the Baltimore City Police, governed by a memorandum of understanding.

As the enforcement arm of the Baltimore circuit and district court system, the Baltimore City Sheriff's Office, created by state constitutional amendment in 1844, is responsible for the security of city courthouses and property, service of court-ordered writs, protective and peace orders, warrants, tax levies, prisoner transportation and traffic enforcement. Deputy Sheriffs are sworn law enforcement officials, with full arrest authority granted by the constitution of Maryland, the Maryland Police and Correctional Training Commission and the Sheriff of the City of Baltimore.

The United States Coast Guard, operating out of their shipyard and facility (since 1899) at Arundel Cove on Curtis Creek, (off Pennington Avenue extending to Hawkins Point Road/Fort Smallwood Road) in the Curtis Bay section of southern Baltimore City and adjacent northern Anne Arundel County. The U.S.C.G. also operates and maintains a presence on Baltimore and Maryland waterways in the Patapsco River and Chesapeake Bay. "Sector Baltimore" is responsible for commanding law enforcement and search & rescue units as well as aids to navigation.

Baltimore City Fire Department

The city of Baltimore is protected by the over 1,800 professional firefighters of the Baltimore City Fire Department (BCFD), which was founded in December 1858 and began operating the following year. Replacing several warring independent volunteer companies since the 1770s and the confusion resulting from a riot involving the "Know-Nothing" political party two years before, the establishment of a unified professional fire fighting force was a major advance in urban governance. The BCFD operates out of 37 fire stations located throughout the city and has a long history and sets of traditions in its various houses and divisions.

State government

Since the legislative redistricting in 2002, Baltimore has had six legislative districts located entirely within its boundaries, giving the city six seats in the 47-member Maryland Senate and 18 in the 141-member Maryland House of Delegates. During the previous 10-year period, Baltimore had four legislative districts within the city limits, but four others overlapped the Baltimore County line. , all of Baltimore's state senators and delegates were Democrats.

State agencies

Federal government

Two of the state's eight congressional districts include portions of Baltimore: the 2nd, represented by Dutch Ruppersberger and the 7th, represented by Kweisi Mfume. Both are Democrats; a Republican has not represented a significant portion of Baltimore in Congress since John Boynton Philip Clayton Hill represented the 3rd District in 1927, and has not represented any of Baltimore since the Eastern Shore-based 1st District lost its share of Baltimore after the 2000 census; it was represented by Republican Wayne Gilchrest at the time.

Maryland's senior United States senator, Ben Cardin, is from Baltimore. He is one of three people in the last four decades to have represented the 3rd District before being elected to the United States Senate. Paul Sarbanes represented the 3rd from 1971 until 1977, when he was elected to the first of five terms in the Senate. Sarbanes was succeeded by Barbara Mikulski, who represented the 3rd from 1977 to 1987. Mikulski was succeeded by Cardin, who held the seat until handing it to John Sarbanes upon his election to the Senate in 2007.

|}

The Postal Service's Baltimore Main Post Office is located at 900 East Fayette Street in the Jonestown area.

The national headquarters for the United States Social Security Administration is located in Woodlawn, just outside of Baltimore.

Education

Colleges and universities
Baltimore is the home of numerous places of higher learning, both public and private. 100,000 college students from around the country attend Baltimore City's 12 accredited two-year or four-year colleges and universities. Among them are:

Private

 Johns Hopkins University
 Baltimore International College
 Loyola University Maryland
 Maryland Institute College of Art
 St. Mary's Seminary and University
 Notre Dame of Maryland University
 The Peabody Institute of Johns Hopkins University
 Stratford University (Baltimore campus)

Public

 Baltimore City Community College
 Coppin State University
 Morgan State University
 University of Baltimore
 University of Maryland, Baltimore

Primary and secondary schools

The city's public schools are managed by Baltimore City Public Schools, and include schools that have been well known in the area: Carver Vocational-Technical High School, the first African American vocational high school and center that was established in the state of Maryland; Digital Harbor High School, one of the secondary schools that emphasizes information technology; Lake Clifton Eastern High School, which is the largest school campus in Baltimore City of physical size; the historic Frederick Douglass High School, which is the second oldest African American high school in the United States; Baltimore City College, the third oldest public high school in the country; and Western High School, the oldest public all-girls school in the nation. Baltimore City College (also known as "City") and Baltimore Polytechnic Institute (also known as "Poly") share the nation's second-oldest high school football rivalry.

Transportation

The city of Baltimore has a higher-than-average percentage of households without a car. In 2015, 30.7 percent of Baltimore households lacked a car, which decreased slightly to 28.9 percent in 2016. The national average was 8.7 percent in 2016. Baltimore averaged 1.65 cars per household in 2016, compared to a national average of 1.8.

Roads and highways
Baltimore's highway growth has done much to influence the development of the city and its suburbs. The first limited-access highway serving Baltimore was the Baltimore–Washington Parkway, which opened in stages between 1950 and 1954. Maintenance of it is split: the half closest to Baltimore is maintained by the state of Maryland, and the half closest to Washington by the National Park Service. Trucks are only permitted to use the northern part of the parkway. Trucks (tractor-trailers) continued to use U.S. Route 1 (US 1) until Interstate 95 (I-95) between Baltimore and Washington opened in 1971.

The Interstate highways serving Baltimore are I-70, I-83 (the Jones Falls Expressway), I-95, I-395, I-695 (the Baltimore Beltway), I-795 (the Northwest Expressway), I-895 (the Harbor Tunnel Thruway), and I-97. The city's mainline Interstate highways—I-95, I-83, and I-70—do not directly connect to each other, and in the case of I-70 end at a park and ride lot just inside the city limits, because of freeway revolts in Baltimore. These revolts were led primarily by Barbara Mikulski, a former United States senator for Maryland, which resulted in the abandonment of the original plan. There are two tunnels traversing Baltimore Harbor within the city limits: the four-bore Fort McHenry Tunnel (opened in 1985 and serving I-95) and the two-bore Harbor Tunnel (opened in 1957 and serving I-895). The Baltimore Beltway crosses south of Baltimore Harbor over the Francis Scott Key Bridge.

The first interstate highway built in Baltimore was I-83, called the Jones Falls Expressway (first portion built in the early 1960s). Running from the downtown toward the northwest (NNW), it was built through a natural corridor, which meant that no residents or housing were directly affected. A planned section from what is now its southern terminus to I-95 was abandoned. Its route through parkland received criticism.

Planning for the Baltimore Beltway antedates the creation of the Interstate Highway System. The first portion completed was a small strip connecting the two sections of I-83, the Baltimore-Harrisburg Expressway and the Jones Falls Expressway.

The only U.S. Highways in the city are US 1, which bypasses downtown, and US 40, which crosses downtown from east to west. Both run along major surface streets; however, US 40 utilizes a small section of a freeway cancelled in the 1970s in the west side of the city originally intended for Interstate 170. State routes in the city also travel along surface streets, with the exception of Maryland Route 295, which carries the Baltimore–Washington Parkway.

The Baltimore City Department of Transportation (BCDOT) is responsible for several functions of the road transportation system in Baltimore, including repairing roads, sidewalks, and alleys; road signs; street lights; and managing the flow of transportation systems. In addition, the agency is in charge of vehicle towing and traffic cameras. BCDOT maintains all streets within the city of Baltimore. These include all streets that are marked as state and U.S. highways as well as the portions of I-83 and I-70 within the city limits. The only highways within the city that are not maintained by BCDOT are I-95, I-395, I-695, and I-895; those four highways are maintained by the Maryland Transportation Authority.

Transit systems

Public transit

Public transit in Baltimore is mostly provided by the Maryland Transit Administration (abbreviated "MTA Maryland") and Charm City Circulator. MTA Maryland operates a comprehensive bus network, including many local, express, and commuter buses, a light rail network connecting Hunt Valley in the north to BWI Airport and Cromwell (Glen Burnie) in the south, and a subway line between Owings Mills and Johns Hopkins Hospital. A proposed rail line, known as the Red Line, which would link the Social Security Administration to Johns Hopkins Bayview Medical Center and perhaps the Canton and Dundalk communities, was cancelled  by Governor Larry Hogan; a proposal to extend Baltimore's existing subway line to Morgan State University, known as the Green Line, is in the planning stages.

The Charm City Circulator (CCC), a shuttle bus service operated by Veolia Transportation for the Baltimore Department of Transportation, began operating in the downtown area in January 2010. Funded partly by a 16 percent increase in the city's parking fees, the circulator provides free bus service seven days a week, picking up passengers every 15 minutes at designated stops during service hours.

The CCC's first bus line, the Orange route, travels between Hollins Market and Harbor East. Its Purple route, launched June 7, 2010, operates between Fort Avenue and 33rd St. The Green route runs between Johns Hopkins and City Hall. The Charm City Circulator operates a fleet of diesel and hybrid vehicles built by DesignLine, Orion, and Van Hool.

Baltimore also has a water taxi service, operated by Baltimore Water Taxi. The water taxi's six routes provide service throughout the city's harbor, and was purchased by Under Armour CEO Kevin Plank's Sagamore Ventures in 2016.

In June 2017, The BaltimoreLink started operating; it is the redesign of the region's initial bus system. The BaltimoreLink runs through downtown Baltimore every 10 minutes via color-coded, high-frequency CityLink routes.

Intercity rail

Baltimore is a top destination for Amtrak along the Northeast Corridor. Baltimore's Penn Station is one of the busiest in the country. In FY 2014, Penn Station was ranked the seventh-busiest rail station in the United States by number of passengers served each year. The building sits on a raised "island" of sorts between two open trenches, one for the Jones Falls Expressway and the other for the tracks of the Northeast Corridor (NEC). The NEC approaches from the south through the two-track,  Baltimore and Potomac Tunnel, which opened in 1873 and whose  limit, sharp curves, and steep grades make it one of the NEC's worst bottlenecks. The NEC's northern approach is the 1873 Union Tunnel, which has one single-track bore and one double-track bore.

Just outside the city, Baltimore/Washington International (BWI) Thurgood Marshall Airport Rail Station is another stop. Amtrak's Acela Express, Palmetto, Carolinian, Silver Star, Silver Meteor, Vermonter, Crescent, and Northeast Regional trains are the scheduled passenger train services that stop in the city. Additionally, MARC commuter rail service connects the city's two main intercity rail stations, Camden Station and Penn Station, with Washington, D.C.'s Union Station as well as stops in between. The MARC consists of 3 lines; the Brunswick, Camden and Penn. On December 7, 2013, the Penn Line began weekend service.

Airports

Baltimore is served by two airports, both operated by the Maryland Aviation Administration, which is part of the Maryland Department of Transportation. The airport is named after Thurgood Marshall, a Baltimore native who was the first African American to serve on the Supreme Court of the United States. In terms of passenger traffic, BWI is the 22nd busiest airport in the United States. As of calendar year 2014, BWI is the largest, by passenger count, of three major airports serving the Baltimore–Washington Metropolitan Area. It is accessible by I-95 and the Baltimore–Washington Parkway via Interstate 195, the Baltimore Light Rail, and Amtrak and MARC Train at BWI Rail Station.

Baltimore is also served by Martin State Airport, a general aviation facility, to the northeast in Baltimore County. Martin State Airport is linked to downtown Baltimore by Maryland Route 150 (Eastern Avenue) and by MARC Train at its own station.

Pedestrians and bicycles
Baltimore has a comprehensive system of bicycle routes in the city. These routes are not numbered, but are typically denoted with green signs displaying a silhouette of a bicycle upon an outline of the city's border, and denote the distance to destinations, much like bicycle routes in the rest of the state. The roads carrying bicycle routes are also labelled with either bike lanes, sharrows, or Share the Road signs. Many of these routes pass through the downtown area. The network of bicycle lanes in the city continues to expand, with over  added between 2006 and 2014. Alongside bike lanes, Baltimore has also built bike boulevards, starting with Guilford Avenue in 2012.

Baltimore currently has three major trail systems within the city. The Gwynns Falls Trail runs from the Inner Harbor to the I-70 Park and Ride, passing through Gwynns Falls Park and possessing numerous branches. There are also many pedestrian hiking trails traversing the park. The Jones Falls Trail currently runs from the Inner Harbor to the Cylburn Arboretum; however, it is currently undergoing expansion. Long-term plans call for it to extend to the Mount Washington Light Rail Stop, and possibly as far north as the Falls Road stop to connect to the Robert E. Lee boardwalk north of the city. It will also incorporate a spur alongside Western Run. The two aforementioned trails carry sections of the East Coast Greenway through the city. There is also the Herring Run Trail, which runs from Harford Road east to its end beyond Sinclair Lane, utilizing Herring Run Park; long-term plans also call for its extension to Morgan State University and north to points beyond. Other major bicycle projects include a protected cycle track installed on both Maryland Avenue and Mount Royal Avenue, expected to become the backbone of a downtown bicycle network. Installation for the cycletracks is expected in 2014 and 2016, respectively.

In addition to the bicycle trails and cycletracks, Baltimore has the Stony Run Trail, a walking path that will eventually connect from the Jones Falls north to Northern Parkway, utilizing much of the old Ma and Pa Railroad corridor inside the city. In 2011, the city undertook a campaign to reconstruct many sidewalk ramps in the city, coinciding with mass resurfacing of the city's streets. A 2011 study by Walk Score ranked Baltimore the 14th most walkable of fifty largest U.S. cities.

Port of Baltimore

The port was founded in 1706, preceding the founding of Baltimore. The Maryland colonial legislature made the area near Locust Point as the port of entry for the tobacco trade with England. Fells Point, the deepest point in the natural harbor, soon became the colony's main ship building center, later on becoming leader in the construction of clipper ships.

After Baltimore's founding, mills were built behind the wharves. The California Gold Rush led to many orders for fast vessels; many overland pioneers also relied upon canned goods from Baltimore. After the Civil War, a coffee ship was designed here for trade with Brazil. At the end of the nineteenth century, European ship lines had terminals for immigrants. The Baltimore and Ohio Railroad made the port a major transshipment point. Currently the port has major roll-on/roll-off facilities, as well as bulk facilities, especially steel handling.

Water taxis also operate in the Inner Harbor. Governor Ehrlich participated in naming the port after Helen Delich Bentley during the 300th anniversary of the port.

In 2007, Duke Realty Corporation began a new development near the Port of Baltimore, named the Chesapeake Commerce Center. This new industrial park is located on the site of a former General Motors plant. The total project comprises  in eastern Baltimore City, and the site will yield  of warehouse/distribution and office space. Chesapeake Commerce Center has direct access to two major Interstate highways (I-95 and I-895) and is located adjacent to two of the major Port of Baltimore terminals. The Port of Baltimore is one of two seaports on the U.S. East Coast with a  dredge to accommodate the largest shipping vessels.

Along with cargo terminals, the port also has a passenger cruise terminal, which offers year-round trips on several lines, including Royal Caribbean's Grandeur of the Seas and Carnival's Pride. Overall five cruise lines have operated out of the port to the Bahamas and the Caribbean, while some ships traveled to New England and Canada. The terminal has become an embarkation point where passengers have the opportunity to park and board next to the ship visible from Interstate 95. Passengers from Pennsylvania, New York and New Jersey make up a third of the volume, with travelers from Maryland, Virginia, the District and even Ohio and the Carolinas making up the rest.

Environment
Baltimore's Inner Harbor, known for its skyline waterscape and its tourist-friendly areas, was horribly polluted. The waterway was often filled with garbage after heavy rainstorms, failing its 2014 water quality report card. The Waterfront Partnership of Baltimore took steps to remediate the waterways, in hopes that the harbor would be fishable and swimmable once again.

Trash interceptors

Baltimore has four water wheel trash interceptors for removing garbage in area waterways. One is at the mouth of Jones Falls in Baltimore's Inner Harbor, dubbed "Mr. Trash Wheel." Another, "Professor Trash Wheel" was added at Harris Creek in the Canton neighborhood in 2016, with "Captain Trash Wheel" following at Mason Creek in 2018 and "Gwynnda, the Good Wheel of the West" at the mouth of the Gwynns Falls in 2021. A February 2015 agreement with a local waste-to-energy plant is believed to make Baltimore the first city to use reclaimed waterway debris to generate electricity.

Other water pollution control
In August 2010, the National Aquarium assembled, planted, and launched a floating wetland island designed by Biohabitats in Baltimore's Inner Harbor. Hundreds of years ago Baltimore's harbor shoreline would have been lined with tidal wetlands. Floating wetlands provide many environmental benefits to water quality and habitat enhancement, which is why the Waterfront Partnership of Baltimore has included them in their Healthy Harbor Initiative pilot projects. Biohabitats also developed a concept to transform a dilapidated wharf into a living pier that cleans Harbor water, provides habitat and is an aesthetic attraction. Currently under design, the top of the pier will become a constructed tidal wetland.

Other projects to improve water quality include the Blue Alleys project, expanded street sweeping, and stream restoration.

Media

Baltimore's main media outlet since 2010 is Baltimore Brew, edited by Fern Shen and Mark Reutter, investigative journalists of the Washington Post and Baltimore Sun, respectively.  The Baltimore Sun was sold by its Baltimore owners in 1986 to the Times Mirror Company, which was bought by the Tribune Company in 2000. Since the recent sale, The Baltimore Sun prints some local news along with regional and national articles.   The Baltimore News-American, another long-running paper that competed with the Sun, ceased publication in 1986.

The city is home to the Baltimore Afro-American, an influential African American newspaper founded in 1892.

In 2006, The Baltimore Examiner was launched to compete with The Sun. It was part of a national chain that includes The San Francisco Examiner and The Washington Examiner. In contrast to the paid subscription Sun, The Examiner was a free newspaper funded solely by advertisements. Unable to turn a profit and facing a deep recession, The Baltimore Examiner ceased publication on February 15, 2009.

Despite being located 40 miles northeast of Washington, D.C., Baltimore is a major media market in its own right, with all major English language television networks represented in the city. WJZ-TV 13 is a CBS owned and operated station, and WBFF 45 (Fox) is the flagship of Sinclair Broadcast Group, the largest station owner in the country. Other major television stations in Baltimore include WMAR-TV 2 (ABC), WBAL-TV 11 (NBC), WUTB 24 (TBD), WBFF-DT2 45.2 (MyNetworkTV), WNUV 54 (CW), and WMPB 67 (PBS). Baltimore is also served by low-power station WMJF-CD 39 (Ion), which transmits from the campus of Towson University.

Nielsen ranked Baltimore as the 26th-largest television market for the 2008–2009 viewing season and the 27th-largest for 2009–2010. Arbitron's Fall 2010 rankings identified Baltimore as the 22nd largest radio market.

Notable people

 Spiro Agnew, 39th US vice president
 Cass Elliot (1941–1974), born Ellen Naomi Cohen, singer, member of The Mamas & the Papas
 Eubie Blake, early jazz pianist and composer
 Tom Clancy, author of the Jack Ryan Book Series
 Elijah Cummings, civil rights advocate and congressman of the US House of Representatives
 Gervonta Davis, professional boxer, four-time world champion in two weight classes
 Daniel Coit Gilman, founding president of Johns Hopkins University
 David Hasselhoff, actor, producer, businessman
 Kyle Harrison, professional lacrosse player, first black Tewaaraton Award recipient
 Johns Hopkins, American entrepreneur, investor, and philanthropist; namesake of Johns Hopkins University
 Thurgood Marshall, African-American US Supreme Court Justice
 H. L. Mencken, American journalist, essayist, satirist, cultural critic, and scholar of American English
 Ric Ocasek, American musician and frontman of the Cars
 Nancy Pelosi, speaker of the US House of Representatives
 Michael Phelps, Olympic swimmer
 Edgar Allan Poe, poet
 Emily Post, author of etiquette books
 Babe Ruth, baseball player
 Jada Pinkett Smith, actress, singer, and businesswoman
 M. Carey Thomas, American educator, suffragist, and linguist
 Anne Tyler, Pulitzer Prize-winning novelist
 John Waters, filmmaker
 Frank Zappa, singer, guitarist, composer, and satirist
 Julie Bowen, actress
 Muggsy Bogues, basketball player

International relations

Baltimore's own Sister City Committees recognize eight of these sister cities, indicated above with a "B" notation.

Three additional sister cities have "emeritus status":
 Genova, Italy (1985)
 Ely O'Carroll, Ireland
 Bremerhaven, Germany (2007)

See also
 Baltimore Development Corporation
 Baltimore in fiction
 Baltimore National Heritage Area
 Bluegrass in Baltimore: The Hard Drivin' Sound and Its Legacy (Book on the history of the Appalachian migrants' move into the city in the 20th century)
 History of the Germans in Baltimore, Maryland
 USS Baltimore, 6 ships
 :Category:Cemeteries in Baltimore

Explanatory notes

References

Citations

General bibliography 
 Brooks, Neal A. & Eric G. Rockel (1979). A History of Baltimore County. Towson, Maryland: Friends of the Towson Library.
 Crenson, Matthew A. (2017). Baltimore: A Political History. Baltimore, MD: Johns Hopkins University Press.
 Dorsey, John, & James D. Dilts (1997). A Guide to Baltimore Architecture. Third Edition. Centreville, Maryland: Tidewater Publishers. (First edition published in 1973.) .
 Hall, Clayton Coleman (1912). Baltimore: Its History and Its People. New York: Lewis Historical Publishing Company. Vol. 1.
 Orser, Edward W. (1994). Blockbusting in Baltimore: the Edmonston Village Story. University Press of Kentucky.
 Scharf, J. Thomas (1879). History of Maryland from the Earliest Period to the Present Day. Baltimore: John B. Piet. Vol. 1; Vol. 2; Vol. 3.
 
 Townsend, Camilla (2000). Tales of Two Cities: Race and Economic Culture in Early Republican North and South America: Guyaquil, Ecuador, and Baltimore, Maryland. University of Texas Press. .

Further reading

External links

 
 Baltimore City Council
 Visit Baltimore – official Destination Marketing Organization
 Baltimore City Public Schools
 Baltimore Development Corporation
 Baltimore City Maps, historic maps at the Sheridan Libraries.
 Papenfuse: Atlases and Maps of Baltimore City and County, 1876–1915 & Block Maps, April 2005
 The Wall Street Journal: Baltimore Demographics, 2015.

 
1729 establishments in Maryland
 
Cities in Maryland
Former capitals of the United States
Independent cities in the United States
Maryland counties on the Chesapeake Bay
Maryland counties
Maryland populated places on the Chesapeake Bay
Populated places established in 1729
Port cities and towns in Maryland
Ukrainian communities in the United States
Majority-minority counties and independent cities in Maryland